The 1918 San Fermín earthquake, also known as the Puerto Rico earthquake of 1918, struck the island of Puerto Rico at  on October 11. The earthquake measured 7.1 on the moment magnitude scale and IX (Violent) on the Mercalli intensity scale. The mainshock epicenter occurred off the northwestern coast of the island, somewhere along the Puerto Rico Trench.

The earthquake triggered a tsunami that swept the west coast of the island. The combined effects of the earthquake and tsunami made it one of the worst natural disasters that have struck the island. The losses resulting from the disaster were approximately 76–118 casualties and $4–29 million in property damage.

Earthquake
The epicenter of the 1918 San Fermín earthquake was located in the Mona Passage off the northwestern coast of the island. The strongest ground shaking has been estimated at intensity IX on the Mercalli intensity scale. The resulting tsunami affected primarily the west coast towns of the island (primarily Mayaguez).

Damage

Numerous structures in the west coast suffered irreparable damage. Factories and production facilities were virtually destroyed, while bridges and roads were severely damaged. The earthquake caused several mudslides in areas where the intensity exceeded Level VII, but none caused numerous deaths. Also, the river currents were affected, which, in many cases affected the foundations of many bridges, resulting in their collapse. Telegraph cables under the ocean were damaged, cutting off the island from outside communication for a time.

The reported casualties of the earthquake have been estimated somewhere between 76 and 116 deaths. Approximately 40 of these deaths were caused by the tsunami which swept shore communities. Damage to property was estimated to be between $4 and 29 million.

In Mayagüez, the largest city affected, 700 masonry buildings were damaged and 1,000 wooden houses, so many people were homeless. Major buildings like the church, post office and hall were severely damaged. With fear because of the aftershocks, many people camped out in the hills for weeks.

Tsunami 
As a result of the earthquake, a tsunami lashed the west coast of the island, probably 4–7 minutes after the main shock. Several coastal villages were destroyed and it has been estimated that 40 people drowned (32 in Aguadilla alone) as a direct result of the tsunami.

Aftershocks
Several aftershocks were reported immediately after the main earthquake. On October 24 and November 12, two strong aftershocks were reported on the island. However, no damage was reported as a result.

United States response
The response from the United States was to exempt the municipalities most affected from paying taxes for a short period immediately following the quake: those municipalities were Mayagüez, Aguada, Aguadilla, Añasco and Isabela. The U.S. appropriated funds for the repair of municipal buildings of the most affected municipalities.

Gallery

See also 

 1787 Boricua earthquake
 1867 Virgin Islands earthquake and tsunami
 2019–20 Puerto Rico earthquakes
 Geology of Puerto Rico
 List of disasters in the United States by death toll
 List of earthquakes in 1918
List of earthquakes in Puerto Rico
 List of earthquakes in the Caribbean

References

Sources

Further reading

External links
"Puerto Rico Seismic Network" – University of Puerto Rico, Mayaguez
Significant earthquake – Puerto Rico: Mona Passage – National Geophysical Data Center
M 7.1 - Puerto Rico region – United States Geological Survey
The Tectonic Setting and Geology of Puerto Rico and Its Surrounding Seafloor – National Oceanic and Atmospheric Administration
 Map of Tsunami wave heights in Puerto Rico by USC Tsunami Research Group
 Wave transformation in Coastal Wiki
 Earthquakes and Tsunamis in Puerto Rico and the U.S. Virgin Islands by USGS.gov

Mayagüez, Puerto Rico
San Fermin Earthquake, 1918
San Fermin Earthquake, 1918
1918 tsunamis
Earthquakes in Puerto Rico